Ågren is a Swedish family name.

Some people with these surname include:

 Björn Ågren (born 1979), Swedish guitarist
 Erik Ågren (boxer) (1916–1985), Swedish boxer
 Erik Ågren (writer) (1924–2008), Finnish translator and writer
 Gösta Ågren (born 1936), Finnish author
 Janet Ågren (born 1949), Swedish actor
 Jennifer Ågren (born 1993), Swedish Taekwondo practitioner
 Morgan Ågren (born 1967), Swedish drummer
 Oscar Ågren (1914–1992), Swedish boxer
 Per Ågren (born 1962), Swedish footballer 
 Ulrika Ågren (born 1987), Swedish team handball player

Agren
 Sigrid Agren (born 1992), French fashion model

Swedish-language surnames